Semenogelase (prostate-specific antigen, alpha-seminoprotein, seminin, P-30 antigen, antigen (human clone HPSA-1 prostate-specific protein moiety reduced), gamma-seminoglycoprotein (human protein moiety reduced), gamma-SM, antigen PSA (human prostate-specific), human glandular kallikrein, antigen PSA (human clone 5P1 protein moiety reduced)) is an enzyme. This enzyme catalyses the following chemical reaction

 Preferential cleavage: -Tyr-

This peptidase from trypsin family is present in seminal plasma.

See also 
 Prostate-specific antigen

References

External links 
 

EC 3.4.21